Habromys schmidlyi, sometimes known as Schmidly's deer mouse, is a species of rodent in the family Cricetidae found only in Mexico. Its natural habitat is cloud forest in the Sierra de Taxco, on the border of Guerrero and Mexico states, above 1,800 meters elevation.

The name "Schmidly's deer mouse" is ambiguous, as it is shared by another species, Peromyscus schmidlyi.

References

 

Habromys
Endemic mammals of Mexico
Fauna of the Trans-Mexican Volcanic Belt
Rodents of North America
Mammals described in 2005